The Tolerance Oval is a cricket ground in Abu Dhabi, United Arab Emirates. It was one of the venues used for the 2019 ICC Men's T20 World Cup Qualifier. In July 2021, the ground was awaiting accreditation by the International Cricket Council (ICC) to be used as one of the venues for the 2021 ICC Men's T20 World Cup.

References

Cricket grounds in the United Arab Emirates
Multi-purpose stadiums in the United Arab Emirates